Trailing Danger is a 1947 American Western film directed by Lambert Hillyer and written by J. Benton Cheney. The film stars Johnny Mack Brown, Raymond Hatton, Peggy Wynne, Marshall Reed,  Patrick Desmond and Steve Darrell. The film was released on March 29, 1947, by Monogram Pictures.

Plot

Cast              
Johnny Mack Brown as Johnny
Raymond Hatton as Waco
Peggy Wynne as Kay Bannister
Marshall Reed as Jim Holden
Patrick Desmond as Hal Hathaway
Steve Darrell as George Bannister
Eddie Parker as Riley 
Bonnie Jean Hartley as Paradise Flo
Ernie Adams as Pennypacker
Bud Osborne as Mason 
Cactus Mack as Sam 
Kansas Moehring as Sheriff Clayton
Gary Garrett as Bruce

References

External links
 

1947 films
American Western (genre) films
1947 Western (genre) films
Monogram Pictures films
Films directed by Lambert Hillyer
American black-and-white films
1940s English-language films
1940s American films